Afrique 50  is a 1950 French documentary film directed by René Vautier. The first French anti-colonialist film, the film derived from an assignment in which the director was to cover educational activities by the French League of Schooling in West Africa (in modern Mali and Ivory Coast). Vautier later filmed what he saw, a "lack of teachers and doctors, the crimes committed by the French Army in the name of France, the instrumentalization of the colonized peoples". For his role in the film Vautier was imprisoned over several months. The film was not permitted to be shown for more than 40 years.

References

External links 

1950 films
1950 documentary films
French short documentary films
1950s short documentary films
1950 short films
Films set in the French colonial empire
Documentary films about African resistance to colonialism
Films directed by René Vautier
French black-and-white films
Film controversies in France
Films shot in Mali
Films shot in Ivory Coast
1950s French films